This filmography presents a list of Japanese boy band Arashi's work outside of music such as hosting variety programs, appearing in films and television dramas and presenting radio shows.

Drama

V no Arashi
 was a Japanese mini-drama that aired on Fuji Television (Fuji TV) from October 11, 1999, to October 29, 1999, with each episode lasting for six minutes.

Saigo no Yakusoku

Movie

Pikanchi Life Is Hard Dakedo Happy
 is a 2002 Japanese movie based on an original idea by Yoshihiko Inohara and directed by Yukihiko Tsutsumi. The movie revolves around five friends who all have no future plans after high school. The five main characters are: Haru (Satoshi Ohno), Chu (Sho Sakurai), Shun (Masaki Aiba), Takuma (Kazunari Ninomiya), and Bon (Jun Matsumoto). Released on June 25, 2003, the DVD debuted at number four on the Oricon weekly comprehensive DVD chart.

Pikanchi Life Is Hard Dakara Happy
 is a 2004 Japanese movie directed by Yukihiko Tsutsumi. The movie picks up three years after Pikanchi Life Is Hard Dakedo Happy, in which the five friends, now all in their 20s, have a reunion. Released on October 20, 2004, the DVD debuted at number two on the Oricon weekly comprehensive DVD chart.

Kiiroi Namida
The movie is based on a manga by Shinji Nagashima. In the bustle of 1960s Tokyo, five ambitious young men cross paths and develop a strong friendship.

Pikanchi Life Is Hard Tabun Happy
 (read as Pikanchi Half) is a 2014 Japanese movie based on an original idea by Yoshihiko Inohara and directed by Hisashi Kimura. Pikanchi Half is a spin-off episode of the two previous movies in the series, showing the five friends, now in their 30s, having a reunion as they are running into problems with family and work.

Variety

Nippon Television

Mayonaka no Arashi
 was a Japanese variety show that ran from October 3, 2001, to June 26, 2002, on Nippon Television (NTV). Aired from 12:45 to 1:15 a.m. (JST), it was Arashi's first independent variety show, in which they were the primary hosts.

Described as an adventure show, at least one member would solitarily explore different parts of Japan by bicycle until sunrise without any money or a map. He would board the last train of the night and exit the train at any station he pleases. The starting point of the journey across Japan began at Makurazaki Station in the Kagoshima Prefecture (south of Japan) and ended at Cape Sōya in Hokkaidō (north of Japan), where Arashi and their co-host Shinichi Hatori (Zoom in! Super newscaster) buried a time capsule containing items the members received during their adventures and letters to their future selves. Hatori and Arashi opened the time capsule during the group's live tenth anniversary special Odoroki no Arashi! The Century's Biggest Experiments! Impossible Feats Special & Miracle Experiments Live Broadcast! on November 1, 2009.

C no Arashi
 was a Japanese variety show that ran from July 3, 2002, to June 18, 2003, on NTV. Aired from 12:58 to 1:28 a.m. (JST), it was Arashi's second variety show to be aired on NTV. Forming Japan's first claim processing company and acting as "Claim Agents", at least one member would help process the complaints of government offices and enterprises every week.

D no Arashi

G no Arashi
 was a Japanese variety show that ran from October 5, 2005, to September 27, 2006, on NTV. Aired from 12:50 to 1:20 a.m. (JST), it was Arashi's fourth variety show to be aired on NTV. The show centered on Arashi acting as supporters for other people, which ranged from solving personal problems to helping promote the awareness of minor sports.

Arashi no Shukudai-kun
 was a Japanese variety show that was first broadcast on October 2, 2006, on NTV. It aired from 11:58 p.m. to 12:29 a.m. (JST) every Monday and starred the members of Arashi and morning announcer  as their co-host. The theme centered on homework, hence the show's title; Arashi had audience viewers send in homework for guests to do and vice versa. The show ended on March 22, 2010.

Arashi ni Shiyagare
 (Must Be ARASHI!) is an ongoing Japanese variety show on NTV starring the members of Arashi. The show began on 24 April 2010 and it airs from 10:00 to 10:54 p.m. (JST) every Saturday. It is Arashi's sixth and current variety show to be aired on NTV as well as their third show to be aired during primetime. There will be a male guest, which the members of Arashi addresses as 'Aniki' (Brother), who will teach Arashi different things. The other section, called 'Encounter the Unknown', is where Arashi will pick up new skills, such as interviewing celebrities, learning the tips to climb a mountain, from meeting experienced professionals they usually have not met before. On September 11, 2020 it was revealed that AniShi would stop airing by the end of the year.

Fuji Television

Nama Arashi: Live Storm
 was a Japanese variety show that ran from October 5, 2002, to March 27, 2004, on Fuji Television (Fuji TV). It aired from 12:00 to 1:00 p.m. (JST) and was the group's first variety show on Fuji TV.

Arashi no Waza-Ari
 was a Japanese variety show that ran from April 3, 2004, to March 26, 2005, on Fuji TV. It aired from 12:00 to 12:55 p.m. (JST), and the theme of the show centered on Arashi learning how to be adults by consulting a special guest.

Mago Mago Arashi

GRA
GRA (Gold Rush Arashi) was a short-lived Japanese variety show that ran from October 20, 2007, to March 29, 2008, from 1:00 to 1:30 p.m. (JST) on Fuji TV.

VS Arashi
 is an ongoing Japanese variety show on Fuji TV. The show began on April 12, 2008, and, until September 19, 2009, aired on Saturday afternoons from 12:59 to 1:30 p.m. (JST). On October 22, 2009, the show moved to a Thursday time slot and airs from 7:00 to 7:57 p.m. (JST), making it Arashi's first show to air during Golden Time. The different games that the variety show includes are:
Bound Hockey, Bank Bowling, Cliff Climb, Dual Curling, Falling Pipe, Giant Crash, GoGo Sweeper, Jumping Shooter, Jungle Bingo, Kicking Sniper, Korokoro Viking, Pinball Runner, Popcorn Hitter, Shotgun Disc, Rolling Coin Tower, Downhill Shooter, Bomber Striker. VS Arashi saw its last episode in December 2020.

Tokyo Broadcasting System

Himitsu no Arashi-chan
 was a Japanese variety show on Tokyo Broadcasting System (TBS) starring Arashi and the members of Othello as their co-hosts. The show ran from April 10, 2008, to March 21, 2013, and aired from 10:00 to 10:54 p.m. (JST) every Thursday, making it the group's first show to air during primetime. There are different segments in the variety show:
Arashi Sharehouse, V.I.P Room, V.I.P Limousine, Mote Mote Arashi! Dame Dame Arashi!, Mannequin 5, Host Royale, Ranking Derby, Doubt Actor.

Television specials

Radio shows

Event hosting

Commercials
In addition to starring in various TV shows, specials, and movies, Arashi appears in various commercials to endorse products for various companies ranging from fast food to video games. Here is a list of them.

List of commercials
 au by KDDI (2008–2012)
 Bourbon Japan (2000–2002)
 Coca-Cola (2003)
 GREE (2012)
 Wacky Motors (Ninomiya, Ohno)
 GungHo Online Entertainment (2014–2020)
 Hitachi (2010–2020)
 House Foods (2003–2008, 2010–2011)
 Osacks (2003–2005)
 Vitamin Water, Vitamin Jelly, Lemon Water (2006–2007)
 Tongari Corn (2007-2008, 2010–2011)
 Japan Airlines (2010–2020)
 Japan Post Holdings (2015–2020)
 Japan Tourism Agency (2010–2020)
 Kirin Company (2010–2020)
 Tanrei Green Label (2010–2013)
 Kirin Ichiban Shibori (2014–2020)
 McDonald's (2001)
 Mitsuya Cider (2010-2020)
 Morinaga Eskimo Pino (2002–2003)
 Nintendo (2010–2012)
 Mario series
 Mario Kart Wii (Matsumoto, Ninomiya)
 New Super Mario Bros. Wii (Ninomiya, Ohno)
 Super Mario Galaxy 2 (Aiba, Ninomiya)
 Super Mario 3D Land (Ninomiya)
 Mario Kart 7 (All members)
 Wii Party (All members except Sakurai)
 Wii Sports Resort (Aiba, Ohno)
 Donkey Kong Country Returns (Matsumoto, Sakurai)
 Nintendo 3DS (All members)
 The Legend of Zelda: Ocarina of Time 3D (Matsumoto, Ninomiya)
 Nissan (2012–2015)
 Pure Drive Series
 Notteko Nissan Campaign
 Nissan Wakuteku Campaign
 Nissan Serena S-Hybrid (Aiba, Ohno)
 Nissan Note (Ninomiya, Sakurai)
 Nissan Note Medalist (Matsumoto)
 Nissan Cube (Matsumoto, Ohno, Sakurai)
 Nissan Leaf (Sakurai)
 Nissan Dayz (Matsumoto, Ohno)
 Nissan Dayz Roox (Aiba)
 NTT DoCoMo dHits (2016)
 Parco  Grand Bazaar (2004)
 Stand up Hawaii!! Campaign (2002)

Other
While in hiatus, Arashi continues giving fans something to keep them in mind, such as the release of the film "ARASHI Anniversary Tour 5×20: Record of Memories", a look at one of the 5x20 concerts, held on December 23, 2019, at Tokyo Dome. With the number "5" holding a special meaning since day one, referring to the unchanging number of members, and the only changing number being the one after, as in 5x20, the release of the information on May 22, 2021 gives a subtle hint to the continuation of the group (5x22), since in 2021 Arashi would celebrate 22 years of career. "ARASHI Anniversary Tour 5×20: Record of Memories" was screened first at the 24th Shanghai International Film Festival (June 11-20, 2021), and later in Japan on November 3, 2019, as pre-release, with its official release on November 26, both in normal and Dolby Cinema formats. The film was screened in other Asian countries, like Korea, Singapore, Malaysia, Hong Kong, indonesia and Taiwan. It was also screened in the US, including Hawaii, where the group started. On September 15, 2022, the film was released in a 4K/regular Blu-ray disc format set, and as a sole Blu-ray disc. The film reached the top spot in the movie genre category of the "Oricon Weekly BD Ranking". It was the first time in Oricon's history that a work achieved the highest first week sales exceeding 300,000 units sold, by selling 363,000 units.

Footnotes

References

External links
NTV
Official C no Arashi website 
Official G no Arashi website 
Official Arashi no Shukudai-kun website 
Official Arashi ni Shiyagare website 
Official Arashi Challenge Week website 

Fuji TV
Official VS Arashi website 

TBS
Official Himitsu no Arashi-chan website 

Japanese filmographies
Musical group filmographies